Rank comparison chart of air forces of Asian states.

Enlisted

See also
Comparative air force officer ranks of Asia
Air force officer rank insignia

References

Asia
Air force ranks
Military comparisons